Rachel Bianchi-Quarshie is a Ghanaian pilot and the youngest female in the country to fly at a commercial airline.

Biography 
Rachel Bianchi-Quarshie is among the few female pilots in Ghana. She became interested in becoming a pilot at a young age of ten when she saw a pilot. She was abused by her step dad while growing up and her family was financially incapable of helping her pursue her dream of becoming a pilot. Unable to look further, she enrolled at a school of accountancy and obtained the second part professional Association of Chartered Certified Accountants (ACCA) certification at the age of 22. She later received financial assistance from friends to pursue an education in flight training which she started in 2008 at Bournemouth Commercial Flight Training Centre in the United Kingdom where part of her family lived. She went ahead to study at the Stapleford Flight Centre and was awarded the Commencement to Air Transport Pilot Licence in 2010. She again enrolled at the Flight Safety International in the United States in 2011 to obtain a US commercial licence. She was awarded One of the "Top 20 2019 global women of excellence" from the Multi Ethnic Advisory Task Force of US congressman Danny K. Davis

References

Ghanaian aviators
Women commercial aviators
Year of birth missing (living people)
Living people